Charleston most commonly refers to:

 Charleston, South Carolina
 Charleston, West Virginia, the state capital
 Charleston (dance)

Charleston may also refer to:

Places

Australia
 Charleston, South Australia

Canada
 Charleston, Newfoundland and Labrador
 Charleston, Nova Scotia

New Zealand
 Charleston, New Zealand

United Kingdom
 Charleston Farmhouse, Sussex, artists' house open to the public
 Charleston, Angus, near Dundee, Scotland
 Charleston, Dundee, Scotland
 Charleston, Paisley, Scotland

United States
 Charleston, Arizona
 Charleston, Arkansas
 Charleston, Illinois
 Charleston, Iowa
 Charleston, Kansas
 Charleston, Kentucky
 Charleston, Maine
 Charleston, Mississippi
 Charleston, Missouri
 Charleston, Nevada
 Charleston, New Jersey
 Charleston, New York
 Charleston, Staten Island, in New York City, New York
 Charleston, North Carolina
 Charleston, Oklahoma
 Charleston, Oregon
 Charleston, Tennessee
 Charleston, Utah
 Charleston, Vermont
 Charleston County, South Carolina
 Charleston Township, Coles County, Illinois
 Charleston Township, Kalamazoo County, Michigan
 Charleston Township, Tioga County, Pennsylvania
 Mount Charleston, Nevada, Clark County, a town
 Mount Charleston, Nevada, a mountain
 North Charleston, South Carolina
 South Charleston, Ohio
 South Charleston, West Virginia
 West Charleston, Ohio

Naval history
 USS Charleston, several US Navy ships
 Charleston, later Texan schooner Zavala

Railway stations
 Charleston station (West Virginia), US
 North Charleston station, South Carolina, US

Education
 Charleston Collegiate School, South Carolina
 Charleston High School (disambiguation)
 College of Charleston, in South Carolina
 College of Charleston Cougars, athletic teams nicknamed "Charleston"
 University of Charleston, West Virginia
 Charleston Golden Eagles, athletic team
 Charleston Academy, Inverness, Scotland

Music
 "Charleston" (1923 song)
 "Charleston", a song by Brendan James
 Charleston (Den Harrow song)
 "Charleston", a song by Sons of Bill
 "Charleston", a track on the 1979 Mike Oldfield album Platinum

Other uses
 Charleston (name)
 Charleston (novel),by John Jakes, 2002
 Charleston, a 1981 novel by Alexandra Ripley
 Charleston (1974 film), Italy
 Charleston (1977 film), Italy
 Charleston Open, a tennis tournament, Charleston, South Carolina
 Charleston, a procedure in mahjong
 Charleston, a model of the Citroën 2CV car
 Charleston, restaurant in Baltimore, Maryland

See also
 Charleston metropolitan area (disambiguation)
 Charlestown (disambiguation)
 Charlton (disambiguation)
 Charlottetown (disambiguation)